"Kiss You Off" is the fourth and final radio-released single from the Scissor Sisters' second studio album, Ta-Dah. Plans for a fifth radio-released single from Ta-Dah had been cancelled due to poor charting positions on prior single releases.  The single was followed by the limited edition "fan-only" release of "Lights".

The single was released in the UK on 28 May 2007. It entered the UK Singles Chart at #43. The official release sticker on the back of the promo CD sent to radio stations had this to say:
2007 Release of a Single that is a Change in Style for Scissor Sisters as Ana Matronic Takes Care of the Lead Vocals on a Song that Draws from the New Wave Scene of the Early 80s and is the Ultimate Break-up Song. "It's not a love song, it's a falling-out-of-love song," she laughs. "It's about knowing you're better than how you're being treated in a relationship and getting the fuck out... and then telling him to kiss your ass!" Includes a Backing Remix by Mr. Oizo! 

The video is set in a futuristic beauty salon and was directed by Robert Hales.

Track listings

10" vinyl square picture disc
"Kiss You Off" (album version) – 5:02

UK CD single
"Kiss You Off" (album version) – 5:02
"Kiss You Off" (Mr. Oizo remix) – 4:20

International CD single
"Kiss You Off" (album version) – 5:02
"Making Ladies" – 4:39
"Kiss You Off" (Mr. Oizo remix) – 4:20
"Kiss You Off" (music video)

UK iTunes digital single
"Kiss You Off" (album version) – 5:02
"Bad Shit" (demo) – 2:28
"Kiss You Off" (Mr. Oizo remix) – 4:20

Australian iTunes digital EP
"Kiss You Off" – 5:03
"Kiss You Off" (Mr. Oizo remix) – 4:17
"Making Ladies" – 4:42

Versions
"Kiss You Off" (album version) – 5:02
"Kiss You Off" (radio edit) – 3:43
"Kiss You Off" (Mr. Oizo remix) – 4:20

Charts

References

External links
Official website
News on the Scissor Sisters' official website

Scissor Sisters songs
2006 songs
2007 singles
Songs written by Babydaddy
Songs written by Ana Matronic
Songs written by Jake Shears
Polydor Records singles